Pseudolaguvia fucosa is a species of catfish from the Karnaphuli River drainage system in Mizoram, India.

References

Erethistidae
Catfish of Asia
Fish of India
Taxa named by Heok Hee Ng
Taxa named by Lalramliana
Taxa named by Samuel Lalronunga
Fish described in 2016